William John Maynes (26 September 1902 – 4 August 1966) was a Canadian sprinter. He competed in the men's 4 × 400 metres relay at the 1924 Summer Olympics.

References

External links
 

1902 births
1966 deaths
Athletes (track and field) at the 1924 Summer Olympics
Canadian male sprinters
Olympic track and field athletes of Canada
Sportspeople from Saint John, New Brunswick